Saint Géry-Vers (Languedocien: Sent Juèli e Vèrn) is a commune in the department of Lot, southern France. The municipality was established on 1 January 2017 by merger of the former communes of Saint-Géry (the seat) and Vers.

See also 
Communes of the Lot department

References 

Communes of Lot (department)